Vietnamization or Vietnamisation (chữ Hán: 越化 or , chữ Hán: 越南化) is the acquisition or imposition of elements of Vietnamese culture, in particular the Vietnamese language and customs. This was experienced in some historic periods by the non-Vietnamese populations of territories controlled or substantially under the influence of Vietnam. As with other examples of cultural assimilation, it could either be voluntary or forced and is most visible in the case of territories where the Vietnamese language or culture were dominant or where their adoption could result in increased prestige or social status, as was the case of the nobility of Champa, or other minorities like Tai, Chinese and Khmers. To a certain extent Vietnamization was also administratively promoted by the authorities regardless of eras.

Summary
Vietnamization is one of major example over cultural assimilation.

Dated back from the antiquity of ancient Vietnam, the Vietnamese state, regardless which Governments, had initiated its attempt to assimilate by introducing Vietnamization across the country. Vietnamization efforts were divided into two eras:

 Ancient and medieval Vietnam: judging the complicated nature of Vietnam and its country, especially Đại Việt, Vietnamese Emperors used several assimilation process; in one side, loyalty and state assimilation were done with Tai and Hmong tribes within the country; and in one side, is forced ethnic assimilation on remaining ethnics, such as Chinese, Chams, Montagnards, Malays and Khmers. While the first one was more successful, as Tai and Hmong tribes of Vietnam remain largely loyal to the Imperial Vietnamese dynasties, the second one tended to be less successful, due to resistance and even violence. To ensure total ethnic assimilation in later territory, the Vietnamese often used brutal violence and executions.
 Modern Vietnam: due to previous wars, the Vietnamese process of forced assimilation tended to be derived by pacifying various ethnic groups. As Vietnamese just regained their independence from France and Japan, it found themselves vulnerable and even unthinkable break-up of Vietnamese state. Since more than 30% Vietnamese population then were not Vietnamese and had a tendency of supporting separatism, Vietnamese nationalists of Vietnam independence movement, notably Việt Minh, regardless what types, both emphasized the need for the ethnic and cultural homogeneity of the state in the long term. This trend went continued at the heat of Vietnam War, especially in South Vietnam while North Vietnam also followed similar methods despite varied tactics. The promotion of Vietnamese language in administration and society soon proved to be the greater threat for non-Vietnamese, eventually leading them to resistance against Vietnamese rule. Eventually, it led to en-masse ethnic rebellions, notably in the South, where its policies were believed to have alienated native population alike. Even after 1975, ethnic rebellions would remain a problem for the newly established communist Government, but unlike the former Imperial and South Vietnamese Governments which had struggle on maintaining unity in the south, the Communists implemented Vietnamese nationalist fervors and employing Józef Piłsudski-based state assimilation, judging their loyalty on the state above while do not rule out ethnic assimilation once there were rebellions. Subsequently, ethnic rebellions started to be weakened, though not completely ended, such as Degar rebellion in Central Highlands in 2003.

Antiquity to medieval Vietnamization
Attempts to assimilate non-Vietnamese people began in ancient era, after decades suffering Chinese domination of Vietnam and Sinicization on Vietnamese people. By the time of ancient Văn Lang and Âu Lạc, as well as Nanyue, assimilation policy had not existed.

Using elements of previous Sinicization process, Vietnamese dynasties began its process of Vietnamization on smaller ethnic people, in which targeted on the first, the Tai, Muong, Chinese and other mountainous tribes including the Hmongs. All these attempts were mostly successful, due to being able to gain support and loyalty from these tribes, and this would remain for most of antiquity to medieval eras. There had been previous rebellions against it as well, such as the rebellion of Zhuang Tai tribes led by Nùng Trí Cao, who previously fought together with the Vietnamese against the Song dynasty in fear of Vietnamization against the Zhuang people. The rebellion of Nùng Trí Cao was not able to repel the Vietnamese, but he was able to secure the border within Yunnan, which help him establish a Tai state of Danan (Great South) and then Nanyue. Throughout history, Nùng's relations with the Vietnamese were a controversial one, due to mixed characteristics or both cooperations and his resistance to submission to Vietnamization. The Nùng people in Vietnam today was named after his surname and is still a revered hero, while the Vietnamese Government officially acknowledged Nùng's role on Vietnamese history.

Vietnamization process since then had remained with little interruption, with the only exception of later Fourth Chinese domination of Vietnam. However, the repel of Chinese out from the country soon created a more aggressive Vietnamization, as Vietnam started to attack a number of China's allies like Lan Xang, Lan Na, Cambodia and Champa, as well as penetrating south and attacking Malays in the sea. Captured prisoners and later ethnic people, notably the Hmongs of Central Vietnam, whom unlike the Hmongs of the north, had little to no connection, set up new chapter. Vietnamization of Chams and Khmers was the most known, and the most brutal one. Many Chams had refused the Vietnamese authority within them, and as for the result of the growing Trịnh–Nguyễn War and later Vietnamese Shogunate era, the Nguyễn lords decided to impose restriction of movement on Chams and Khmers, importing Chinese refugees fleeing from Qing conquest of Ming (in which many Chinese immigrants were later Vietnamized, and more successful than with Chams and Khmers). The Vietnamization of Chams went as for the result of resistance by the Chams, with continued from 15th century until the end of Vietnam War, was a sole evidence of the resilient of Vietnamization process; although not judge out anti-Vietnamese unrests by Chams alike.

The process of Vietnamization also penetrated to Central Highlands, creating an uneasy sense of sentiment among the Montagnards, those who remained independent tribes for many years despite previous incursions. While the former Khmer Empire and Champa were not able to conquer and only put them as vassalage instead, the Vietnamese were more successful, taking over the Highlands and placed them under Vietnamese control. Nonetheless, for the first years under the Nguyễn dynasty, the Vietnamese Imperial Government only considered the region as its buffer zone rather than placing assimilation, as they needed loyalty from these people. Eventually, the process was okay since the Montagnard ethnic tribes were loyal to the Vietnamese state, and even helped the Vietnamese army to suppress Cham rebellion at 1830s. The process would remain until French conquest.

French Indochina from 1858–1954
With the French Empire/French Republic took over Vietnam at 1884, Vietnam went under direct rule of Paris. Nonetheless, due to the complicated nature in the region, France soon found out the only way to build their unity single French Indochina (comprising Laos, Vietnam and Cambodia) was to place a possible ethnic assimilation under the vision of French Government. By this point, the French soon tolerated parts of Vietnamization process, placing Vietnamese officials in the colony and valued them; while on the same time, buying loyalty with non-Vietnamese ethnic groups to de-Vietnamize others, making/inviting them to establish their own community that supportive of France whenever any attempts of Vietnamese rebellions could occur. This was the trend of "divide and rule" policy aimed on Vietnamization process.

For example, Chinese immigration into Vietnam visibly increased following the French colonisation of Vietnam from 1860 onwards following the signing of the Convention of Peking whereby the rights of Chinese to seek employment overseas were officially recognised by the Chinese, British and French authorities. Unlike their Vietnamese predecessors, who would Vietnamize them, the French were very receptive of these Chinese immigrants as it provided an opportunity to stimulate trade and industry, and they generally found employment as labourers or middlemen. The French established a special Immigration Bureau in 1874 requiring Chinese immigrants to register with the Chinese clan and dialect group associations and eased trade restrictions that were previously in place. Historians such as Khanh Tran viewed this as a divide-and-rule policy especially upon the possible Vietnamization, and the intention of its implementation was to minimise the chances of any internal revolt against the French authorities. The Chinese population nevertheless witnessed an exponential increase in the late 19th century and more so in the 20th century; between the 1870s and 1890s, some 20,000 Chinese settled in Cochinchina. Another 600,000 arrived in the 1920s and 1930s, and peaks in the migration patterns was especially pronounced during the 1920s and late 1940s when the effects of fighting and economic instability arising from the Chinese Civil War became pronounced. Both were sponsored and financed by the French authorities in an attempt to de-Vietnamize minorities in French Indochina. This "divide-and-rule" of France would remain in practice, and was very successful on putting ethnic divisions, as France's de-Vietnamization process increased ethnic awareness of non-Vietnamese people.

On the same time, France's assimilation and pacification policy created a new group of educated elites in the country. Notably, France brought Christianity within the Degar community, and the Degar tribes were educated and influenced by French system, which made them one of the most educated minorities in the country. The Montagnards even found their community raising its purpose, which is still relevant today. Assists from France also came to other non-Vietnamese people, though varied on times.

French Government would maintain this ethnic policy as their rule remained in Vietnam until the outbreak of First Indochina War. The war changed rapidly with the rise of Việt Minh, an anti-colonial group that later functioned into its own army. The Việt Minh, represented by the idea of a united Vietnamese state, directly embraced the idea of Vietnamization process and placed minorities on its target via loyalty to the nation. This targeted greatly on non-Vietnamese, and even non-Buddhists, many were thought to have sided with France against the Vietnamese, notably Hmongs, Chams, Khmers and Degars. When France was expelled from Vietnam, the policy of Vietnamization, encouraged by both the communists and Republican Government, continued resulting with forcing name changes, religious conversions and rising Vietnamese awareness.

Vietnam War and after 1975

Both North Vietnam and South Vietnam practiced similar Vietnamization process, as both targeted on its minorities and to raise stronger Vietnamese awareness.

The most relevant was the Vietnamization process launched by the South against its Degar population. Although the South Vietnamese and Degars were common allies of the United States against growing threat from communist North, the South Vietnamese, composed by mainly ethnic Vietnamese and Vietnamized minorities like Khmers, distrusted its Degar allies and had done very little to promote ethnic awareness of Degars. Rather, South Vietnamese Government promoted Vietnamness and Vietnamese nationalism, hoping to completely Vietnamize the Degars, in which after 1975 the communist North continued. The Americans, however, were seen as an unwanted counter against Vietnamization process of Degar minorities, as they formed bonds with the Montagnards while the Montagnards hated the increasing of Vietnamese population regardless North or South alike. Montagnards' alliance with the Americans didn't make them prefer the South Vietnamese, as South Vietnamese Government continued to enact Vietnamization, accused by Montagnards as ethnic genocide on them; in which both South Vietnam and later communist Government of Vietnam vehemently denied. Continuous Vietnamization was sponsored directly by the Southern Government without opposition from ethnic Vietnamese majority.

The Communist North Vietnamese Government, on the other hand, attempted to use Vietnamization process for the same thing, and inherited the previous successful Vietnamization on indigenous Tai, Lao and Hmong tribes in the north to deal with South Vietnam, especially Degars. The Degars were almost opposing every Vietnamese regardless from the South or North, had to face forced displacement by various attacks led by both South Vietnamese and North Vietnamese armies. The Americans were unable to prevent this, despite being ally of both Degars and South Vietnam as Vietnamization had been practiced by both North and South Vietnam alike. Montagnards rebelled against the South Vietnamese in 1974.

Similar to the Degars, the Chams and Khmers were too main major other ethnic people to suffer forced Vietnamization, although Vietnamization had been longer to them than to the Degars. The Vietnamese, already assimilated and Vietnamized the Chams since 15th century, continued to openly discriminate the Chams due to unlimited opposition to Vietnamization among the latter, even fiercer than with Degars due to longer history of contact. Chams had founded the FULRO in hope to fight the much larger and more armed Vietnamese, culminating FULRO insurgency against Vietnam. Same to Degars, Chams and Khmers also fought both North and South Vietnamese Government, and later unified communist Government of Vietnam, and their resistance against Vietnamization process remained.

The end of Vietnam War forced ethnic minorities, mostly in the south, to face forced Vietnamization, or to give up. FULRO became a united force for almost every ethnic minorities of Southern Vietnam against the Vietnamese, composed both Khmers, Chams, Degars and Hmongs (mostly Hmong Christians). The level of insurgency against unified Vietnam came tenser at 1980s after the Vietnamese invasion of Cambodia, received arms and ammunitions against the Vietnamese forces. Cambodians, majority of ethnic Khmers, whom suffered previous discrimination and Vietnamization process, also attempted to resist Vietnamization. Both these resistances eventually ended in complete failure at 1990s, as Vietnam enacted Đổi mới reforms and normalization of relations between Vietnam to China and the West, who used to support de-Vietnamization process. The normalization of relations allowed Vietnam to be free on ongoing Vietnamization process.

Despite the collapse of FULRO and weakening the insurgency, Vietnamization process had been the cause of 2001 and 2004 Degar rebellions in Central Highlands, aimed on the same accusation of Vietnamization. Since then, ongoing Vietnamization forced Degar refugees to flee Vietnam en-masse. In the same thing, Cham and Khmer refugees also attempted to flee from Vietnam due to Vietnamization, even it is not large like the situation of Degar refugees.

References

Further reading
 
 

History of Vietnam
Vietnamese culture
Cultural assimilation
Khmer language